Partial general elections were held in Belgium on 14 June 1859. The result was a victory for the Liberal Party, which won 69 of the 116 seats in the Chamber of Representatives and 31 of the 58 seats in the Senate. Voter turnout was 55.9%, although only 49,672 people were eligible to vote.

Under the alternating system, elections for the Chamber of Representatives were only held in five out of the nine provinces: Antwerp, Brabant, Luxembourg, Namur and West Flanders. Additionally, special elections were held on the same day in the arrondissements of Charleroi, Liège and Mons.

Campaign
Twelve of the 58 seats were uncontested, of which the Catholics won nine and the Liberals three.

Results

Chamber of Representatives

The results exclude the voting figures for the Leper Colony seat.

Senate

Constituencies
The distribution of seats among the electoral districts was as follows for the Chamber of Representatives, with the difference compared to the previous election due to population growth:

References

1850s elections in Belgium
General
Belgium
Belgium